The  Janaraja Padakkama ("Republic Medal") was awarded to police officers in Sri Lanka who were in service on 22 May 1972, when Ceylon became a republic. It is similar to the Republic of Sri Lanka Armed Services Medal issued to the armed forces.

See also
 Awards and decorations of the Sri Lanka Police
 Republic of Sri Lanka Armed Services Medal

References

External links
Sri Lanka Police

Civil awards and decorations of Sri Lanka
Law enforcement awards and honors
Awards established in 1972
1972 establishments in Sri Lanka